Jantoven (Upsher-Smith Laboratories)
Jayln (GlaxoSmithKline)
Jeanatope (Iso-Tex Diagnostics)
jenkem
Jintropin
josamycin (INN)
Junel